Philip Keith Golding (born 25 July 1962) is an English professional golfer.

Career
Golding was born in Luton, Bedfordshire. He was a promising cricketer who played for Middlesex Colts before he took up golf at the age of 17. He turned professional in 1981, becoming an assistant at his local golf club.

Golding has been a regular fixture at the European Tour's qualifying school, where in 2007 he stretched his record to 18 appearances. He has often won a tour card, but up to the age of forty he had never done well enough on the Tour to retain his card automatically.

In 2003 Golding won the Open de France, one of Europe's most prestigious events, on his 201st tour start. His prize of €416,660 was more than twice as much as he had ever won in a complete season before that year, and he went on to finish the season in a career best 32nd place on the Order of Merit. After falling away again in 2004 he had a solid season in 2005, with a pair of top ten finishes, but he has struggled since, returning to qualifying school again in 2006 and 2007. In 2008, he was again unable to retain his place on the elite tour, and dropped back down to the second tier Challenge Tour for 2009.

Having been a past winner of the Open de France, Golding had an exemption to play on the European Senior Tour from his 50th birthday in mid-2012. Golding won on the European Senior Tour for the first time in August 2013 when he took the Speedy Services Wales Senior Open. He won for a second time the following season at the French Riviera Masters and had two more wins in 2017, in the Swiss Seniors Open and the Travis Perkins Masters. In 2018 he had his biggest senior success, winning the Staysure PGA Seniors Championship.

Professional wins  (10)

European Tour wins (1)

Challenge Tour wins (3)

Other wins (1)
1996 Mauritius Open

European Senior Tour wins (5)

European Senior Tour playoff record (0–1)

Results in major championships

CUT = missed the halfway cut
Note: Golding only played in The Open Championship.

Results in World Golf Championships

"T" = Tied

See also
2007 European Tour Qualifying School graduates

References

External links

English male golfers
European Tour golfers
European Senior Tour golfers
PGA Tour Champions golfers
Sportspeople from Luton
1962 births
Living people